North Wembley is a railway station on the Watford DC line and Bakerloo line in North Wembley, north-west London. The station is served by London Overground and London Underground services. It is between South Kenton to the north, and Wembley Central to the south and located on the south side of East Lane, part of the London Borough of Brent, serving residents of North Wembley and western parts of Wembley Park.

History
The station was first opened by the London and North Western Railway on 15 June 1912 as part of the "New Line" between Euston and Watford Junction; LER, Bakerloo line services began on 16 April 1917. Originally to be called East Lane, after the road passing over the railway at this location, it was named North Wembley from opening. It was built to the same general design as the other new stations on the same line and the layout at North Wembley station makes it almost identical to Kenton two stops to the north. Ticket gates and departure boards were recently installed at this station.

Services
Platform 1 for southbound services.
 Services to London Euston operated by London Overground – approximately every 15 minutes (4tph).
 Services to Elephant & Castle operated by London Underground – every 10 minutes (6tph).

Platform 2 for northbound services.
 Services to Watford Junction operated by London Overground – approximately every 15 minutes (4tph).
 Services to Harrow and Wealdstone operated by London Underground – every 10 minutes (6tph).

Connections
London Buses route 245 and London Buses route 483 serve the station.

References

External links

Bakerloo line stations
Tube stations in the London Borough of Brent
DfT Category E stations
Railway stations in the London Borough of Brent
Former London and North Western Railway stations
Railway stations in Great Britain opened in 1912
Railway stations served by London Overground
1912 establishments in England